The Northrop Grumman E-8 Joint Surveillance Target Attack Radar System (Joint STARS) is a United States Air Force airborne ground surveillance, battle management and command and control aircraft. It tracks ground vehicles and some aircraft, collects imagery, and relays tactical pictures to ground and air theater commanders.  The aircraft is operated by both active duty U.S. Air Force and Air National Guard units and also carries specially trained U.S. Army personnel as additional flight crew.

Development
Joint STARS evolved from separate United States Army and Air Force programs to develop technology to detect, locate and attack enemy armor at ranges beyond the forward area of troops. In 1982, the programs were merged and the U.S. Air Force became the lead agent. The concept and sensor technology for the E-8 was developed and tested on the Tacit Blue experimental aircraft. The prime contract was awarded to Grumman Aerospace Corporation in September 1985 for two E-8A development systems.

Upgrades
In late 2005, Northrop Grumman was awarded a contract for upgrading engines and other systems.  Pratt & Whitney, in a joint venture with Seven Q Seven (SQS), will produce and deliver JT8D-219 engines for the E-8s. Their greater efficiency will allow the Joint STARS to spend more time on station, take off from a wider range of runways, climb faster, fly higher all with a much reduced cost per flying hour.

In December 2008, an E-8C test aircraft took its first flight with the new engines.  In 2009, the company began engine replacement and additional upgrade efforts.  The re-engining funding was temporarily halted in 2009 as the Air Force began to consider other options for performing the JSTARS mission.

Design

The E-8C is an aircraft modified from the Boeing 707-300 series commercial airliner.  The E-8 carries specialized radar, communications, operations and control subsystems. The most prominent external feature is the 40 ft (12 m) canoe-shaped radome under the forward fuselage that houses the 24 ft (7.3 m) APY-7 active electronically scanned array side looking airborne radar antenna.

The E-8C can respond quickly and effectively to support worldwide military contingency operations. It is a jam-resistant system capable of operating while experiencing heavy electronic countermeasures. The E-8C can fly a mission profile for 9 hours without refueling. Its range and on-station time can be substantially increased through in-flight refueling.

Radar and systems

The AN/APY-7 radar can operate in wide area surveillance, ground moving target indicator (GMTI), fixed target indicator (FTI) target classification, and synthetic aperture radar (SAR) modes.

To pick up moving targets, the Doppler radar looks at the Doppler frequency shift of the returned signal. It can look from a long-range, which the military refers to as a high standoff capability. The antenna can be tilted to either side of the aircraft for a 120-degree field of view covering nearly 19,305 square miles (50,000 km2) and can simultaneously track 600 targets at more than 152 miles (250 km). The GMTI modes cannot pick up objects that are too small, insufficiently dense, or stationary.  Data processing allows the APY-7 to differentiate between armored vehicles (tracked tanks) and trucks, allowing targeting personnel to better select the appropriate ordnance for various targets.

The system's SAR modes can produce images of stationary objects. Objects with many angles (for example, the interior of a pick-up bed) will give a much better radar signature, or specular return. In addition to being able to detect, locate and track large numbers of ground vehicles, the radar has a limited capability to detect helicopters, rotating antennas and low, slow-moving fixed-wing aircraft.

The radar and computer subsystems on the E-8C can gather and display broad and detailed battlefield information. Data is collected as events occur. This includes position and tracking information on enemy and friendly ground forces. The information is relayed in near-real time to the US Army's common ground stations via the secure jam-resistant surveillance and control data link (SCDL) and to other ground C4I nodes beyond line-of-sight via ultra high-frequency satellite communications.

Other major E-8C prime mission equipment are the communications/datalink (COMM/DLX) and operations and control (O&C) subsystems. Eighteen operator workstations display computer-processed data in graphic and tabular format on video screens. Operators and technicians perform battle management, surveillance, weapons, intelligence, communications and maintenance functions.

Northrop Grumman has tested the installation of a MS-177 camera on an E-8C to provide real time visual target confirmation.

Battle management 
In missions from peacekeeping operations to major theater war, the E-8C can provide targeting data and intelligence for attack aviation, naval surface fire, field artillery and friendly maneuver forces. The information helps air and land commanders to control the battlespace.

The E-8's ground-moving radar can tell approximate number of vehicles, location, speed, and direction of travel. It cannot identify exactly what type of vehicle a target is, tell what equipment it has, or discern whether it is friendly, hostile, or a bystander, so commanders often crosscheck the JSTARS data against other sources. In the Army, JSTARS data is analyzed in and disseminated from a Ground Station Module (GSM).

Operational history

The two E-8A development aircraft were deployed in 1991 to participate in Operation Desert Storm under the direction of USAF Colonel Harry H. Heimple, Program Director, even though they were still in development. The joint program accurately tracked mobile Iraqi forces, including tanks and Scud missiles. Crews flew developmental aircraft on 49 combat sorties, accumulating more than 500 combat hours and a 100% mission effectiveness rate.

These Joint STARS developmental aircraft also participated in Operation Joint Endeavor, a NATO peacekeeping mission, in December 1995. While flying in friendly air space, the test-bed E-8A and pre-production E-8C aircraft monitored ground movements to confirm compliance with the Dayton Peace Accords agreements. Crews flew 95 consecutive operational sorties and more than 1,000 flight hours with a 98% mission effectiveness rate.

The 93d Air Control Wing, which activated 29 January 1996, accepted its first aircraft on 11 June 1996, and deployed in support of Operation Joint Endeavor in October. The provisional 93d Air Expeditionary Group monitored treaty compliance while NATO rotated troops through Bosnia and Herzegovina. The first production E-8C and a pre-production E-8C flew 36 operational sorties and more than 470 flight hours with a 100% effectiveness rate. The wing declared initial operational capability 18 December 1997 after receiving the second production aircraft. Operation Allied Force saw Joint STARS in action again from February to June 1999 accumulating more than 1,000 flight hours and a 94.5% mission-effectiveness rate in support of the U.S.-lead Kosovo War.

The twelfth production aircraft, outfitted with an upgraded operations and control subsystem, was delivered to the USAF on 5 November 2001.

On 1 October 2002, the 93d Air Control Wing (93 ACW) was "blended" with the 116th Bomb Wing in a ceremony at Robins Air Force Base, Georgia.  The 116 BW was an Air National Guard wing equipped with the B-1B Lancer bomber at Robins AFB.  As a result of a USAF reorganization of the B-1B force, all B-1Bs were assigned to active duty wings, resulting in the 116 BW lacking a current mission.  The newly created wing was designated as the 116th Air Control Wing (116 ACW). The 93 ACW was inactivated the same day.  The 116 ACW constituted the first fully blended wing of active duty and Air National Guard airmen. The wing took delivery of the 17th and final E-8C on 23 March 2005.

The E-8C Joint STARS routinely supports various taskings of the Combined Force Command Korea during the North Korean winter exercise cycle and for the United Nations enforcing resolutions on Iraq.

In March 2009, a Joint STARS aircraft was damaged beyond economical repair when a test plug was left on a fuel tank vent, subsequently causing the fuel tank to rupture during in-flight refueling.  There were no casualties but the aircraft sustained $25 million in damage.

In September 2009, Loren B. Thompson of the Lexington Institute raised the question of why most of the Joint STARS fleet was sitting idle instead of being used to track insurgents in Afghanistan.  Thompson states that the Joint STARS' radar has an inherent capacity to find what the Army calls 'dismounted' targets—insurgents walking around or placing roadside bombs.  Thompson's neutrality has been questioned by some since Lexington Institute has been heavily funded by defense contractors, including Northrop Grumman.

Recent trials of Joint STARS in Afghanistan are destined to develop tactics, techniques and procedures in tracking dismounted, moving groups of Taliban.

In January 2011, Northrop Grumman's E-8C Joint Surveillance Target Attack Radar System (Joint STARS) test bed aircraft completed the second of two deployments to Naval Air Station Point Mugu, California, in support of the U.S. Navy Joint Surface Warfare Joint Capability Technology Demonstration to test its Network-Enabled Weapon (NEW) architecture.  The Joint STARS aircraft executed three Operational Utility Assessment flights and demonstrated its ability to guide anti-ship weapons against surface combatants at a variety of standoff distances in the NEW architecture. 

From 2001 to January 2011 the Joint STARS fleet flew more than 63,000 hours in 5,200 combat missions in support of Operations Iraqi Freedom, Enduring Freedom and New Dawn.

On 1 October 2011, the "blended" wing construct of the 116th Air Control Wing (116 ACW), combining Air National Guard and Regular Air Force personnel in a single unit was discontinued.  On this date, the 461st Air Control Wing (461 ACW) was established at Robins AFB as the Air Force's sole active duty E-8 Joint STARS wing while the 116 ACW reverted to a traditional Air National Guard wing within the Georgia Air National Guard.  Both units share the same E-8 aircraft and will often fly with mixed crews, but now function as separate units.

On 1 October 2019, JSTARS ended its continuous presence in the United States Central Command (USCENTCOM) areas of responsibility. The 18–year deployment was the second-longest deployment in U.S. Air Force history. In that time, the crews and aircraft flew 10,938 sorties, and 114,426.6 combat hours.

On 11 February 2022, the first of four JSTARS out of the remaining 16 operational JSTARS was retired as detailed in the Fiscal Year 2022 National Defence Authorisation Act (NDAA). The plane (serial number 92-3289/GA) which was the first to arrive at Robins AFB in 1996 has now been transferred to the 309th Aerospace Maintenance and Regeneration Group at Davis–Monthan Air Force Base.

In late 2021 to early 2022, E-8C JSTARS aircraft deployed to Europe during the 2021-2022 Russo-Ukrainian crisis. 30 years after entering service, it was performing the type of mission it had originally been intended to: monitoring Russian military activity in Eastern Europe, which it did while operating over Ukrainian airspace until the start of the 2022 Russian invasion of Ukraine in late February 2022.

Future
The Air Force began an analysis of alternatives (AOA) in March 2010 for its next generation ground GMTI radar aircraft fleet.  The study was completed in March 2012 and recommended buying a new business jet-based ISR aircraft, such as a version of the P-8 Poseidon, and the RQ-4B Global Hawk Block 40.  The Air Force says Joint STARS is in a phase of capability improvements and is expected to remain in operation through 2030.

On 23 January 2014, the USAF revealed a plan for the acquisition of a new business jet-class replacement for the E-8C Joint STARS.  The program is called Joint STARS Recap and plans for the aircraft to reach initial operating capability (IOC) by 2022.  The airframe must be more efficient, and separate contracts will be awarded for developing the aircraft, airborne sensor, battle management command and control (BMC2) system, and communications subsystem. 

On 8 April 2014, the Air Force held an industry day for companies interested in competing for JSTARS Recap; attendees included Boeing, Bombardier Aerospace, and Gulfstream Aerospace. Air Force procurement documents called for a replacement for the Boeing 707-based E-8C as a "business jet class" airframe that is "significantly smaller and more efficient." Indicative specification were for an aircraft with a 10-13 person crew with a  radar array and capable of flying at 38,000 ft for eight hours.  

In August 2015, the Air Force issued contracts to Boeing, Lockheed Martin, and Northrop Grumman for a one-year pre-engineering and manufacturing development effort to mature and test competing designs ahead of a downselect in late 2017.  

During the fiscal 2019 budget rollout briefing it was announced that the Air Force will not move forward with an E-8C replacement aircraft. Funding for the JSTARS recapitalization program was instead be diverted to pay for development of an advanced battle management system.

Variants

E-8A
 Original platform configuration.
TE-8A
 Single aircraft with mission equipment removed, used for flight crew training.
YE-8B
 Single aircraft, was to be a U.S. Navy E-6 but transferred to the U.S. Air Force as a development aircraft before it was decided to convert second-hand Boeing 707s (1 from a Boeing CC-137) for the JSTARS role.
E-8C
 Production Joint STARS platform configuration converted from second-hand Boeing 707s (1 from a CC-137).

Operators

United States Air Force - 17 in service as of Jul. 2018
Air Combat Command - 1991–present 
461st Air Control Wing - Robins Air Force Base, Georgia
12th Airborne Command and Control Squadron 
16th Airborne Command and Control Squadron 
Air National Guard - 2006–present
116th Air Control Wing - Robins Air Force Base, Georgia
128th Airborne Command and Control Squadron

Specifications (E-8C)

See also

References

Citations

Bibliography

External links

 Northrop Grumman Joint STARS System Information
 Northrop Grumman Joint STARS Radar Information
 Boeing Integrated Defense Systems
 Northrop Grumman ISR overview
 Joint STARS Re-engine Program Info

E-08 Joint STARS
Radar networks
E-08 Joint Stars
Quadjets
E-8 Joint Stars
Aircraft first flown in 1991
E-08 Joint STARS
E-08 Joint STARS